The Euphrates Islamic Liberation Front (Jabhat al-Tahrir al-Furat al-Islamiyyah) was a Syrian rebel alliance that was active during the Syrian civil war. The group became defunct since late 2014.

Affiliated groups
 Ahfad al-Rasul Brigades
 Jihad in the Path of God Brigade
 Martyr Abu Furat Battalions
 Liwa al-Fatah al-Mubin
 Manbij Martyrs Brigades
 Ansar and Dawah Martyrs Brigades
 Descendants of the Companions Brigade
 Righteous Banner Brigades
 Light of God Islamic Jihad Battalion
 Abu Dhar al-Ghifari Battalion 
 Sword of Islam Battalion 
 Dawn of Islam Battalion
 Raqqa Martyrs Battalion
 Free Raqqa Battalion 
 212 Air Defence Battalion

See also
List of armed groups in the Syrian Civil War

References

External links

 Euphrates Islamic Liberation Front Facebook page

Anti-government factions of the Syrian civil war
Anti-ISIL factions in Syria
Military units and formations established in 2014
Military units and formations disestablished in 2014